The 2022 NCAA Men's National Collegiate Volleyball Tournament was the 51st edition of the NCAA Men's National Collegiate Volleyball Championship, an annual tournament to determine the national champion of NCAA Division I and Division II men's collegiate indoor volleyball. The single-elimination tournament began with play-in matches. The entire tournament was hosted by the University of California Los Angeles from May 1 to 7, 2022 at Pauley Pavilion in Los Angeles, California. Hawai'i defeated Long Beach State for their second consecutive national championship 3–0 (the school's 2002 title was vacated due to NCAA violations). 

All opening round matches were streamed on PAC-12.com. The semifinals were on live on NCAA.com. ESPN2 broadcast the National Championship on May 7.

Bids
The tournament field was announced on NCAA.com Sunday, April 24, 2022 at 1 p.m. EDT.

Schedule and results
All times Pacific.

Bracket

All Tournament Team

 Spyros Chakas, Hawai'i  (Most Outstanding Player)
 Dimitrius Mouchlias, Hawai'i 
 Alex Nikolov, Long Beach State 
 Spencer Olivier, Long Beach State
 Jakob Thelle, Hawai'i

References

2022
NCAA Men's Volleyball Championship
NCAA Men's Volleyball Championship
2022 NCAA Division I & II men's volleyball season